Saint-Martin-d'Étampes is a railway station in Étampes, Essonne, in the southern suburbs of Paris, France. The station was opened in 1970 and is on the Étampes–Beaune-la-Rolande railway. The station is served by Paris' express suburban rail system, the RER. The train services are operated by SNCF.

The line beyond the station was closed in 1969. The RER service was launched here in 1979. It was necessary to build this station, as trains could not terminate at Étampes without causing disruption to the Paris–Bordeaux railway.

Train services
The following services serve the station:

Local services (RER C) Saint-Martin d'Étampes–Juvisy–Paris–Issy–Versailles-Chantiers–Saint-Quentin-en-Yvelines

See also 
 List of stations of the Paris RER

External links 

 

Réseau Express Régional stations
Railway stations in Essonne
Railway stations in France opened in 1970